Fuglebjerg is a town , with a population of 2,268 (1 January 2022), in Næstved Municipality on Zealand in Region Sjælland in Denmark.

Fuglebjerg was the municipal seat of the former Fuglebjerg Municipality, until 1 January 2007.

Fuglebjerg Church

Fuglebjerg Church consist of a Romanesque nave and a late Gothic weapon house facing north. The tower dates back to 1838.

Fuglebjerg Municipality

Fuglebjerg Municipality was a municipality (Danish, kommune) in Vestsjælland County on the west the island of Zealand (Sjælland) in south Denmark. The municipality covered an area of 141 km2, and had a total population of 6,582 (2005).  Its last mayor was Henrik Willadsen, a member of the Venstre (Liberal Party) political party.

On January 1. 2007, Fuglebjerg Municipality ceased to exist as the result of Kommunalreformen ("The Municipality Reform" of 2007).  It was merged with existing Fladså, Næstved, Holmegaard, and Suså municipalities to form the new Næstved Municipality.  This created a municipality with an area of 681 km2 and a total population of 78,446 (2005).

Notable people 
 Finn Viderø (1906 in Fuglebjerg – 1987) a Danish organist, known for his recordings of classic organ works

References

 Municipal statistics: NetBorger Kommunefakta, delivered from KMD aka Kommunedata (Municipal Data)
 Municipal mergers and neighbors: Eniro new municipalities map

External links
 The new Næstved municipality's official website 

Cities and towns in Region Zealand
Former municipalities of Denmark
Næstved Municipality